Aups (Provençal  in the classical norm, Aup in the Mistralian norm) is a commune in the Var department in the Provence-Alpes-Côte d'Azur region in southeastern France.

Geography
Located in Provence at 500m alt, Aups is in the first foothills of the Alps. The town is at the gates of Verdon River, at 60 km from the sea and 80 km from the snow stations.Aups is named Capital of Haut-Var and Capital of the truffle and was made a part of the Parc naturel régional du Verdon in 2000. Its typically Mediterranean climate makes the village a healthy place to live.

Climate

Aups has a hot-summer Mediterranean climate (Köppen climate classification Csa).

History
The village was named Oppidum de Alpibus (town of the Alps) then Castrum de Alpibus (fortress of the Alps), castrum de Almis, then Alps and now Aups. The place was colonized by the Oxybians (a Ligurian tribe) during the time of Ancient Rome, near Via Aurelia going from Fréjus (Forum Julii) to Riez (Forum Reii). Julius Caesar visited Aups on his way to conquering Gaul. He is supposed to have said, « I would rather be the first man in Aups than the second in Rome ».

In 1574, the town was looted by the Huguenots, who massacred 18 residents. A statue called "Maiden of the Massacre" was erected on square where the massacre took place, in Clock Street.Aups was the centre of the Var Republican insurgency in 1851 against the coup d'état of Napoleon III, and became known as the "Center of Red Var".

Aups was a stronghold of the French Resistance during World War II. The city earned the Croix de guerre avec palmes. It was liberated by American forces on 17 August 1944, two days after the Operation Dragoon landings to the south.

Tourism

Truffles
Aups has the third largest black truffle market of France, known for its quality and importance. This market is held every Thursday from November to February.

Provençal Market
There is a colourful Provençal market, every Wednesday and Saturday featuring local products and handicrafts.

People from Aups
 The Blacas house - an old Provençal house, lords and dukes of Aups since the 12th century
 Pierre Petit (1832–1909) - photographer
 General Jean-Baptiste Girard (1775–1815) - Général and baron d'Empire who fought the Napoleonic Wars.
 Pierre Yovanovitch - Interior Designer - Chateau de Fabrègues - a 17th-century castle in Provence all renovated by the designer

See also
Communes of the Var department

References

Communes of Var (department)